Amos Barr Hostetter Jr. (born January 12, 1937) is an American businessman, who was the founder, chairman, and CEO of Continental Cablevision. With an estimated  net worth of around $3.5 billion, he is ranked by Forbes as the 538th richest person in the world as of 2020.  He has also served as the chairman of C-SPAN.

Early life
Hostetter is the son of the late Amos Hostetter, a prominent trader at Commodities Corporation and Hayden Stone.  He attended the Pingry School for his secondary education and graduated in the Class of 1954. After graduating from Amherst College in 1958 with a B.A. in Economics, he obtained a M.B.A. from Harvard University in 1961.

Career
In 1963, Hostetter and his college roommate and fraternity brother, H. Irving Grousbeck, founded Continental Cablevision in Fostoria, Ohio and Tiffin, Ohio. At the time of the company's sale in 1996 to US West, it was the largest privately owned cable company.

Hostetter is currently chairman of Pilot House Associates, LLC.

In 1999, Amos and his wife, Barbara Walsh founded the Barr Foundation which has given out over $710 million in the 21 years since. In 2016, the foundation had assets totaling $1.6 billion and focuses its philanthropy in the Boston region.

Personal life
In 1982, Hostetter married Barbara Lynn Walsh of Lakeville, Connecticut. They have three children: Caroline, Elizabeth, and Tripp.

In 2003, Hostetter purchased the historic Second Harrison Gray Otis House on Mount Vernon Street in Boston for an estimated $12 million.

He is a Life Trustee at Amherst College, his alma mater. Barbara and Amos founded the Barr Foundation in Boston and remain trustees. The $1.6 billion foundation, one of the state's largest philanthropies, makes grants for the arts, education, and climate change. Hostetter donated to the Lincoln Project, a Republican-led super PAC.

References

External links
 Forbes profile
 Amherst College profile
 Harvard Business School profile
 

1937 births
American billionaires
American telecommunications industry businesspeople
American Episcopalians
Amherst College alumni
Businesspeople from New Jersey
C-SPAN people
Harvard Business School alumni
Living people
Pingry School alumni